Lekunutu Tseounyane (born 1 May 1983) is a Mosotho former footballer who played as a goalkeeper for LMPS Maseru. He won four caps for the Lesotho national football team since 2008.

External links
 

Association football goalkeepers
Lesotho footballers
Lesotho international footballers
1983 births
Living people